Herc McIntyre was head of Universal Pictures in Australia from 1920 until the 1950s. He was important in the career of Charles Chauvel, helping finance several of his films. He was also friends with Lee Robinson and helped him distribute The Phantom Stockman (1953).

References

Australian film studio executives
Year of death missing
Place of birth missing
Year of birth missing